St. Joseph Church is a historic Roman Catholic church located on Main Street in Westphalia, Osage County, Missouri. The Gothic-Romanesque building was constructed in 1848. Architectural features include limestone and cottonstone construction, a frame clerestory, and an octagonal apse. A central belfry steeple was added in 1883. The entire structure was remodeled and enlarged in 1905.

The church functioned as the headquarters for the Jesuit Central Missouri Mission from 1838 to 1883 and has been a parish church ever since.

It was added to the National Register of Historic Places in 1972.

References

Churches in the Roman Catholic Diocese of Jefferson City
Churches on the National Register of Historic Places in Missouri
Gothic Revival church buildings in Missouri
Romanesque Revival church buildings in Missouri
Roman Catholic churches completed in 1848
Buildings and structures in Osage County, Missouri
National Register of Historic Places in Osage County, Missouri
19th-century Roman Catholic church buildings in the United States